Boerhaavia diffusa is a species of flowering plant in the four o'clock family which is commonly known as punarnava (meaning that which rejuvenates or renews the body in Ayurveda), red spiderling, spreading hogweed, or tarvine. It is taken in herbal medicine for pain relief and other uses. The leaves of Boerhaavia diffusa are often used as a green vegetable in many parts of India.

Description
 
Boerhaavia diffusa is widely dispersed, occurring throughout India, the Pacific, and southern United States. Flowers are small, around 5 mm in diameter. Pollens are round, roughly 65 microns in diameter.  This wide range is explained by its small fruit, which are very sticky and grow a few inches off the ground, ideally placed to latch on to small migratory birds as they walk by.

Habit

A creeping, perennial, much-branched herb with stout fusi form roots.

Stem

Branches divaricate, stem purplish, thickened at nodes.

Leaves

Opposite, oblique, ovate or sub orbicular, rounded, entire, margins slightly pinkish, wavy, lower surface with small, white scales, base rounded.

Inflorescence

Small umbels forming Corymbose, axillary and terminal panicle.

Flowers

Bracteoles , acute. Perianth -tube constricted above the ovary, limb funnel-shaped, dark-pink, with 5 vertical bands outside.
Stamens 2 or 3, slightly exserted, unequal.
Ovary superior, oblique, ovule 1, erect, stigma.

Fruit

Achene rounded, 6-ribbed.

Seed

Minute, albuminous with endosperm. Embryo curved.

Traditional Uses 

The root acts as an anticonvulsant, analgesic, laxative medication that when rubbed in honey can be locally applied for cataract, chronic conjunctivitis and blepharitis. Useful for curing heart diseases, anemia and edema (or oedema), Punarnava is an effective remedy that reduces swelling and foul smell in skin disorders. Apart from the root, Punarnava's leaves are also consumed as a vegetarian dish to reduce oedema.

Within Ayurvedic medicine, punarnava is used to treat disorders like intestinal colic, kidney disorders, cough, hemorrhoids, skin diseases, alcoholism, insomnia, eye diseases, asthma and jaundice, Boerhavia diffusa (Sri Lankan Name Pita Sudu sarana best green medicine for Diabetes .

Distribution
A true and accurate accounting of the native range of Boerhavia diffusa has not been determined. However, it is very widespread, and has become naturalized in many places. It is believed to be a native plant to the following places in:
Africa —
Botswana, Egypt, Eswatini, Ghana, Kenya, Liberia, Malawi, Mozambique, Namibia, Nigeria, Rwanda, Senegal, Sierra Leone, Somalia, South Africa (Eastern Cape, Gauteng, KwaZulu-Natal, Limpopo, Mpumalanga, Northern Cape provinces), Tanzania, Togo, Uganda, Zambia, and Zimbabwe.
Asia —
Bangladesh, Sri Lanka, Burma, Cambodia, China (Fujian, Guangdong, Guangxi, Guizhou, Hainan, Sichuan, and Yunnan provinces), India, Indonesia, Japan (Ryukyu Islands), Laos, Malaysia, Nepal, Pakistan (Punjab, Sind, Balochistan, Gilgit Baltistan), the Philippines, Southern Taiwan, Thailand, and Vietnam. Also, on the Arabian Peninsula in Oman, Saudi Arabia, and the United Arab Emirates, and Yemen (Socotra).
North America —
Mexico, and the U.S. (in the states of Florida, Georgia, and South Carolina).
Caribbean — 
Anguilla, the Bahamas, the Cayman Islands, Cuba, Dominica, Grenada, Hispaniola (Dominican Republic and Haiti), Jamaica, Montserrat, the Netherlands Antilles (Saba), Puerto Rico, Saint Lucia, Saint Vincent and the Grenadines, and both the British and the U.S. Virgin Islands.
South America —
Argentina, Belize, Bolivia, Chile, Costa Rica, Ecuador, French Guiana, Guatemala, Guyana, Nicaragua, Panama, Paraguay, Peru, Suriname, Uruguay, and Venezuela.
South Pacific —
Fiji, and New Caledonia.

Economic importance 
B. diffusa is widely used as a green leafy vegetable in many Asian and African countries. B. diffusa can be used as a fodder for livestock, but has the potential for contaminating seed stocks, and may harbor pathogens for certain crops, such as eggplants.

Chemistry 
Boerhaavia G and Boerhavia H are two rotenoids isolated from B. diffusa.  A quinolone alkaloid, lunamarine, isolated from B. diffusa has shown some in vitro anticancer, antiestrogenic, immunomodulatory, and anti-amoebic activity (particularly against Entamoeba histolytica).
The plant contains a protein called BDP-30, presumably a ribosome-inactivating protein.

References

External links

Tropical Plant Database
Boerhavia diffusa on ibiblio
 Contains a detailed monograph on Boerhavia diffusa (Punarnava) as well as a discussion of health benefits and usage in clinical practice. Available online at https://web.archive.org/web/20110616192944/http://www.toddcaldecott.com/index.php/herbs/learning-herbs/323-punarnava

diffusa
Plants described in 1753
Taxa named by Carl Linnaeus
Flora of the Caribbean
Flora of Central America
Flora of Africa
Flora of Asia
Flora of Europe
Flora of North America
Flora of South America
Flora without expected TNC conservation status